Inside the Square is a 2009 documentary film directed by David Michod. It is a 30 minutes behind-the-scenes look at the making of 2008 neo-noir thriller film The Square directed by Nash Edgerton, with particular emphasis on the style and difficulties arose during the shooting and the experience of cast and crew during the making of film. It had a limited release in Australia on 5 March 2009.

Synopsis
Behind the scenes production footage and interview of cast and crew of 2008 film The Square.

Cast
David Michod as Interviewer
Nash Edgerton as himself
David Roberts as himself
Claire van der Boom as himself
Joel Edgerton as himself
Anthony Hayes as himself
Hanna Mangan-Lawrence as herself
Peter Phelps as himself
Kieran Darcy-Smith as himself
Bredan Donoghue as himself
Bill Hunter as himself
Julian Morrow as himself
Sam Petty as himself
Louise Smith as herself
Luke Doolan as himself

Production
After the release of 2008 film The Square, David Michod made the documentary on the film with the help of behind the scene footage available. He also interview the cast and crew of the film. They talk about their experience of shooting the film.

Talking about making the documentary on the production of film, Michod said "just bearing witness to the battle of a feature film shoot is a good learning experience."

See also
 Cinema of Australia

References

External links

2009 documentary films
Australian independent films
Australian documentary films
Films directed by David Michôd
Documentary films about films
2009 independent films
2009 films
2000s English-language films